Eupogonius subarmatus is a species of beetle in the family Cerambycidae. It was described by John Lawrence LeConte in 1859. It is known from eastern North America.

References

Eupogonius
Beetles described in 1859